Giacomo Bellacchi (18381924) was an Italian mathematician.

After graduating from Scuola Normale Superiore di Pisa, he became a teacher at a military school and at the Tuscan Technical Institute, where one of his pupils was Vito Volterra.

Over his career, he carried out research both in geometry and algebra. He wrote many works, among which the most prominent is probably Introduzione storica alla teoria delle funzioni ellittiche (Historical Introduction to Elliptic Function Theory), which became well known and was used worldwide. He also wrote many university textbooks.

The library of the Fondazione Scienza e Tecnica in Florence has named after him its precious collection of math books and works.

References

Bibliography

External links 
 Digitized version of Introduzione storica alla teoria delle funzioni ellittiche (Cornell University – Historical library)
 Fondazione Scienza e Tecnica di Firenze

1838 births
1924 deaths
People from Altamura
Italian mathematicians